Navy Pier is a  pier on the shoreline of Lake Michigan, located in the Streeterville neighborhood of the Near North Side community area in Chicago, Illinois, United States. It is one of the most visited attractions in the entire Midwest and is Chicago's second-most visited tourist attraction.

History

Military usage 

Navy Pier opened to the public on July 15, 1916. Originally known as the "Municipal Pier", the pier was built by Charles Sumner Frost, a nationally known architect, with a design based on the 1909 Plan of Chicago by  Daniel Burnham and Edward H. Bennett Its original purpose was to serve as a dock for freights, passenger traffic, and indoor and outdoor recreation; events like expositions and pageants were held there.

In mid-1918, the pier was also used as a jail for draft dodgers. In 1927, the pier was renamed Navy Pier to honor the naval veterans who served in World War I.

In 1941, during World War II, the pier became a training center for the United States Navy; about 10,000 people worked, trained and lived there. The pier contained a 2,500-seat theater, gym, 12-chair barber shop, tailor, cobbler shops, soda fountain and a vast kitchen and hospital.

In 1946, as the Navy was winding down from its mission, the University of Illinois at Chicago held classes at the pier. As the maximum capacity was exceeded, the school outgrew the pier and the university relocated to Circle Campus in 1965. After the university left, the Navy Pier became underutilized.

Later use 
In 1959, the St. Lawrence Seaway opened and increased commercial shipping activity at the pier for a short time, though business died down and left for more modern facilities at Lake Calumet.

In 1976, the East End buildings were renovated and for a brief period the pier was alive again, home to summer events like ChicagoFest. But maintenance was not done and the pier went into decline.

In 1989, the City of Chicago had the Urban Land Institute (ULI) reimagine uses for the pier. The Metropolitan Pier and Exposition Authority (MPEA) was created; its responsibility was to manage and operate Navy Pier as well as McCormick Place. The MPEA undertook the redevelopment, incorporating some of ULI's recommendations.

In 1995, Navy Pier was redesigned and introduced to the public as a mixed-use venue incorporating retail, dining, entertainment and cultural spaces.

Redevelopment

Efforts to update Navy Pier for the 21st century began on January 13, 2006, when the Metropolitan Pier and Exposition Authority released a proposal for a major renovation of the pier, which including a monorail, a 260-foot (79 m) spokeless Ferris wheel, a roller coaster, floating hotel, and a water park with a Great Lakes theme. The plan would have included nearly double the current parking and a replacement theater with a greater capacity. At the time of the announcement, a price tag of $2 billion was announced.

Following the reorganization of the agency that runs Navy Pier and McCormick Place, a new study was commissioned to reinvigorate the upgrade process. The new study, by the Urban Land Institute, was released on November 11, 2010 and recommended a more modest set of enhancements aimed at retaining the pier's role as a public space, rather than turning it into a theme park. Suggested elements include a concert venue, an enlarged Chicago Shakespeare Theater space, new restaurants, a renovated commercial area around the pier's entrance and additional park-like features to bring people closer to the lake. More grandiose possibilities, including the enlarged Ferris wheel and a hotel, are mentioned as more remote possibilities.

In March 2012, a competition led to selection of a design concept presented by a team led by James Corner of James Corner Field Operations that focuses on the pier's role as a waterfront promenade. In 2013, the Authority announced plans to carry out the first elements of a streamlined version of that concept, with reworked streetscape and a wider pedestrian space, moving tour-boat moorings to improve the view from a new central stairway centered on the Ferris wheel. Work began on the redevelopment plan, called The Centennial Vision, during the winter of 2013–2014. The purpose of the plan is to fulfill the mission to keep Navy Pier as a world-class public space and to renovate the pier so it will have more evening and year-round entertainment and more compelling landscape and design features.   The Polk Family Foundation (founded by Sol Polk) donated $20 million to the redevelopment effort; the park and fountain at the entrance to the pier was named the Polk Brothers Park and Fountain.

A new Ferris wheel for the pier was announced on June 23, 2015. Rides now last twelve minutes instead of seven and feature three revolutions. The new wheel has brighter lights and opened in May 2016.

The Centennial Vision's first phase was completed in summer 2016. Work included the redesign of the Pier's public spaces, known as Pierscape, and improvements to the interior of the Family Pavilion and South Arcade. Phase I projects included the transformation of South Dock into a more engaging, greener space, conversion of the South Arcade indoor walkway into a Chicago-themed food experience and creation of a lighted water fountain/ice skating rink in Polk Bros Park. In November 2016, Phase I development achieved Gold certification under the Sustainable SITES Initiative (SITES) rating system, based on its expanded green spaces, improved pedestrian access, energy efficiency, innovative storm water management, and use of recycled local materials.

Phase II projects include the development of a seven-story, 240-room hotel, adjacent to the south side of Festival Hall; marquee additions to the East End Plaza, including a proposed arched, elevated overlook walkway and reflective water feature; a Welcome Pavilion in Polk Bros Park with 4,000 square feet for guest services and programmatic space; a seasonal ice rink within the footprint of the Polk Bros Park's fountain and plaza; and a short-term, north-side boat docking facility for use by recreational boaters seasonally.

Attractions

There are many outdoor attractions at the Navy Pier Park, such as the Pepsi Wave Swinger, Light Tower Ride, Remote Control Boats (now removed along with fountain around the Wave Swinger), Teacups and the Carousel. New for 2021 is Drop Tower, an S&S Double Shot relocated from the closed Pleasure Island.

Amazing Chicago's Funhouse Maze is on the pier. It is a self-paced, full sensory maze experience where a person navigates their way through  of tunnels and mazes.

Crystal Gardens is a one-acre, botanical garden inside the pier. It is a six-story glass atrium with a 50-foot arched ceiling.

The Chicago Children's Museum is a part of the pier, with many different exhibits and activities for both children and adults to enjoy.

Chicago Shakespeare Theater, a theater that performs Shakespeare's productions, is located there. The pier also houses an IMAX theater that opened in 1995, featuring a 60 by 80 foot screen in an auditorium with 395 seats, though operator AMC Theatres announced in March 2021 that the theater was permanently closed.

The original Ferris wheel was retired on September 27, 2015. The new ferris wheel which replaced it is a DW60 from Dutch Wheels, the Netherlands-based company that built the pier's former wheel. The state-of-the-art DW60 is the first of its kind in the U.S. with similar wheels currently in operation in Hong Kong and Baku, Azerbaijan. The new Ferris Wheel was unveiled on May 27, 2016. Around April of 2019, the pier’s original carousel that had operated since 1995 was dismantled and removed. This was due to the original carousel’s mechanism breaking due to cold weather in early 2019. Around late May into June, a new carousel was installed in the site of the original. This new carousel had previously operated at Dorney Park from 1986-2016 under the name Chance Carousel.

Events and art 
Navy Pier hosts sightseeing tours from companies such as Seadog Ventures, Shoreline Sightseeing cruises and Water Taxi service, and the tall ship "Windy". There are also dinner cruises by Entertainment Cruises on their ships the Spirit of Chicago, Odyssey II, and Mystic Blue. The pier has fireworks on Wednesday and Saturday nights during the summer and Saturday nights during the fall.

Navy Pier hosts the Fifth Third Bank Winter Wonderfest from December through January.

Many outdoor art installations are displayed on the pier. The anchor from the naval vessel USS Chicago (CA-136/CG-11) is on display at the far end. Other installations include a statue of actor Bob Newhart on a couch as seen on The Bob Newhart Show, the Captain On The Helm statue dedicated to maritime captains, and the Crack the Whip sculpture of eight children at play holding hands by J. Seward Johnson Jr.

The Festival Halls can be used for sporting events. Festival Halls A and B can be turned into a 170,000 square foot competition arena. Gymnastics meets have been held in the Festival Halls.wheel of fortune live 2000 2002 2008

Bus routes 

CTA

 2 Hyde Park Express (weekday rush hours only)
 29 State
 65 Grand
 66 Chicago
 124 Navy Pier

In popular culture
The halls were used to represent Atlantic City, New Jersey, in the 1986 movie The Color of Money for the 9-Ball Championship.

In the film Divergent, the pier and Ferris wheel are shown abandoned and decayed in a future Chicago and it is stated that they were abandoned by choice a long time before. The Dauntless members play capture the flag in the park. Tris and Four climb the Ferris wheel to spot the opposing team. In the book, the opposing team hides the flag in a park near Navy Pier, while in the film version, the flag is hidden in a tower of the Chicago Children's Museum building.

In the video game NASCAR 09, the pier is featured as a fictional race track.

The album/DVD A Long Day's Night by Blue Oyster Cult was recorded live at Navy Pier/Skyline Stage on June 21, 2002.

See also

Navy Pier Auditorium
Smith Museum of Stained Glass Windows
WBEZ

References

External links

 
 Chicago Children's Museum on Navy Pier
 Chicago Shakespeare Theater on Navy Pier

1916 establishments in Illinois
Buildings and structures completed in 1916
Buildings and structures on the National Register of Historic Places in Chicago
Central Chicago
Gymnastics venues in Chicago
IMAX venues
Chicago Landmarks
Piers in Illinois
Piers on the National Register of Historic Places
Redeveloped ports and waterfronts in the United States
Shopping malls in Chicago
Tourist attractions in Chicago
Transportation buildings and structures on the National Register of Historic Places in Illinois